The following are lists of Portuguese films ordered by decade and year of release. For an alphabetical list of Portuguese films see :Category:Portuguese films.

1930s to 1990s
List of Portuguese films of the 1930s
List of Portuguese films of the 1940s
List of Portuguese films of the 1950s
List of Portuguese films of the 1960s
List of Portuguese films of the 1970s
List of Portuguese films of the 1980s
List of Portuguese films of the 1990s

2000s
List of Portuguese films of 2000
List of Portuguese films of 2001
List of Portuguese films of 2002
List of Portuguese films of 2003
List of Portuguese films of 2004
List of Portuguese films of 2005
List of Portuguese films of 2006
List of Portuguese films of 2007
List of Portuguese films of 2008
List of Portuguese films of 2009

2010s
List of Portuguese films of 2010
List of Portuguese films of 2011
List of Portuguese films of 2012
List of Portuguese films of 2013
List of Portuguese films of 2014
List of Portuguese films of 2015
List of Portuguese films of 2016
List of Portuguese films of 2017
List of Portuguese films of 2018
List of Portuguese films of 2019

2020s
List of Portuguese films of 2020
List of Portuguese films of 2021
List of Portuguese films of 2022

External links
 Portuguese film at the Internet Movie Database